On Saturday 15 September 2001, TAM Linhas Aéreas Flight 9755, a Fokker 100 scheduled domestic passenger flight carrying 88 passengers and six crew, departed Recife/Guararapes–Gilberto Freyre International Airport for São Paulo/Guarulhos International Airport. During the flight, the plane suffered an uncontained engine failure. Fragments of the engine shattered three cabin windows, causing decompression and blowing the passenger in seat 19E partly out of the plane. The passenger blown out of the window did not survive.

Aftermath 
TAM said in an official response that it will provide "all assistance to the victim's family, as well as to other passengers, including medical and psychological care."

Aircraft 
The aircraft was a Fokker 100 with the registration number PT-MRN, which was delivered in May of 1994. The aircraft was repaired and returned to service. After being transferred to other airlines, it ended up with Iran Air and was registered as EP-CFH. The aircraft has since been stored.

See also 
 British Airways Flight 5390
 Southwest Airlines Flight 1380
Reeve Aleutian Airways Flight 8

References

External links 
Final Report - CENIPA 

Aviation accidents and incidents in Brazil
2001 in Brazil
Aviation accidents and incidents in 2001
Accidents and incidents involving the Fokker 100
9755
Airliner accidents and incidents caused by engine failure
Airliner accidents and incidents involving in-flight depressurization
Airliner accidents and incidents involving uncontained engine failure